Bimal Kar (19 September 1921 — 26 August 2003) was an Indian writer and novelist who wrote in Bengali. He received the 1975 Sahitya Akademi Award presented by the Sahitya Akademi, India's National Academy of Letters, for his novel Asamay.

Personal life and education
Bimal Kar was born in Taki in the North 24 Parganas, in 1921. Bimal Kar had lived in various places in and around Bihar like Jabalpur, Hazaribagh, Gomoh and Dhanbad. He died on 26 August 2003.

Career
Bimal Kar has written many Bengali classics. He also wrote dramas depicting society.

The special ability of Kar was that he had many completely different narration styles. For example, he has written superb stories without any dialogue, and he has also written noteworthy ones almost entirely comprising dialogue. His mastery of the Western Bengal and Chhota Nagpur locales matched well his in-depth association with modern Calcutta. Another special strength was his willingness to think when necessary like a woman.

He was involved in myriad professions that later helped him write on varied subjects. His writings reflect a modern mind and have inspired many young writers whom he also supported at the start of their literary careers.

For children, He created the retired magician Kinkar Kishore Ray, alias Kikira who solved mysteries with his two assistants. He created another detective character called Victor.

After moving to Kolkata, Bimal Kar worked as a journalist with Parag, Paschimbanga and Satyajug.

From 1954 to 1982, he was associated with Desh where his novel Grahan was published in 1964. Asamay, also published in Desh, won him the Sahitya Akademi award in 1975. Kar won the Ananda Puraskar in 1967 and the Saratchandra Award from Calcutta University in 1981, among other honours.

Apart from Desh, the other magazines he was associated with were Shiladitya and Galpapatro.

Kar's other works include novels like Dewal, Purna Apurna, Jadubansa and Balika Badhu. He introduced a new trend in Bengali short stories with his lucid language. He could win over the heart of the average reader of Bengali literature with his ability to craft characters and the fine art of storytelling. Many of his novels were made into films.

Bibliography

Novels
Deoyal
Nim Fuler Gondho
Kushilob
Asamay
Sannidho
Dongson
Khorkuto
Moho
Dwip
Procchonno
A Aboron
Swapne
Nirosro
Osesh
Mallica
Granthi
Balika Badhu

Works for younger audience
Raboner Mukhosh (Ananda Pub.)
Ekti Photo Churi'r Rahasya (Ananda Pub.)
Neel Banorer Haar (Ananda Pub.)
Aloukik (Ananda Pub.)
Ekti Obhisopto Puthi o OstodhatU (Ananda Pub.)
Pakhighar (Ananda Pub.)
Bagher Thaba (Ananda Pub.)
Kalbaishakhir Ratre
Jadukorer Rahsyamoy Mreetyu (Ananda Pub.)
Circus theke Palea (Ananda Pub.)
Holud Palak Badha Teer (Ananda Pub.)
Sudhananda Pretsidha o Kikira (Ananda Pub.)
Harano Diarir Khoje (Ananda Pub.)
Mondargarher Rahasyamay Jotsna (Ananda Pub.)
Bhuler Phade Nabakumar (Ananda Pub.)
Turuper Sesh Tash (Ananda Pub.)
Sonar Gharir Khoje (Ananda Pub.)
Haider Laner Tero Nombor Barir Coffin Baxo (Ananda Pub.)
Gajopati Bhejitable Shoe Company (Ananda Pub.)
Kishore Phire Esechilo (Ananda Pub.)
Jhiler Dhare Ekdin (Ananda Pub.)
Phuldani Club (Ananda Pub.)
Sonali Saper Chobol (Ananda Pub.)
Mayurganjer Nirshigosadan
Doshti Kishore Uponyas (Ananda Pub.)
Kikira Somogro (Vol 1-3) (Ananda Pub.)
Swanirbachito Kishore Golpo (Punascha)
Sisher Angti (Punascha)
Ajab Desher Gajab Raja (Gangchil)
Ek Bhoutik Malgari aar Guardsaheb (Srestha Bhuter Golpo, Tulikolom)

Pakhik Anandamela Golpo Sonkolon
Magician
Bhunikaka'r Chauroshtomh
Keu Ki Esechilo
Mojadar Ek Football Match aar Danapuri

PujaBarshiki Anandamela Golpo Sonkolon
Bonobiral (Pujabarshiki Anandamela,1388)
Ekti Bhuture Ghori

Doshti Kishore Uponyas
Wondermama
Gojopoti Vegetable Shoe Company
Aloukik
Siser Angti
Harano Jeep er Rahasya
Kisore Fire Esechilo
Mondargor'er Rahasyamoy Jyotsna
Harano Diary'r Khonje
Kaalbaishakh'er Ratre
Rabon'er Mukhosh

Drama
Ghughu

Cinema
He also has to his credit several novels that were successfully adapted for the screen. These include the classic comedy, Basanta-Bilap, the evergreen Balika Badhu (1967) aka The Young Wife (International: English title), later remade in Hindi as Balika Badhu (1976), Jadubangsha and Chhuti (1967) (based on his novel, Khar-Kuto), Dillagi (1978) aka Mischief (International: English title), Bonobhumi.

References

 Writers from Kolkata

External links
Short Biography in Bengali
Ananda Publishers er website

Bengali writers
Bengali detective fiction writers
Recipients of the Ananda Purashkar
Recipients of the Sahitya Akademi Award in Bengali
Indian children's writers
2003 deaths
People from Asansol
University of Calcutta alumni
1921 births
Novelists from West Bengal
20th-century Indian novelists
Writers from West Bengal